Castillo de Villamalefa is a municipality of Spain in the Valencian Community, in the province of Castellón. It has a population of 104 (2005) and an area of 37.7 km².

References

Municipalities in the Province of Castellón